Devil Boruta is a fictional character from Polish mythology, folklore and literature, associated with the Polish town of Łęczyca.

The character is the transformation of the pagan Slavic demon leshy in post-Christianization times. Boruta is also referred to as błotnik, a swamp spirit known in the mythology of the Kashubians and especially the Eastern Slavs, where he is called a bolotnik.

He was usually considered to be a nobleman, and accordingly, he was usually busy with corrupting nobles, leaving other social classes to other devils - like Rokita the devil from the same region, who more often tempted peasants. Tales that do mention his coat of arms overwhelmingly say it's Nowina - albeit, with Polish coat of arms being often shared among a number of unrelated families, this did not lay any shame upon its other users.

References

Slavic mythology
Polish legends
Slavic demons